Howard Barbieri (born November 7, 1987) is a former American football guard. He played college football at Rutgers.

Raised in Middletown Township, New Jersey, Barbieri played on the defensive line for the football team at Middletown High School South.

College career
Barbieri played college football at Rutgers.

Professional career

Tampa Bay Buccaneers
Barbieri signed with the Tampa Bay Buccaneers on July 31, 2013. Barbieri was waived on August 13, 2013.

References

External links
Tampa Bay Buccaneers bio

1987 births
Living people
American football offensive guards
Rutgers Scarlet Knights football players
Tampa Bay Buccaneers players
Middletown High School South alumni
Players of American football from New Jersey
People from Middletown Township, New Jersey
Sportspeople from Monmouth County, New Jersey